Gustavus Hume Rochfort (circa 1750 – 30 January 1824) was an Anglo-Irish politician. 

Rochfort was the son of George Rochfort and Alice, daughter of Sir Gustavus Hume, 3rd Baronet. 

He was the High Sheriff of Westmeath in 1796 and the Member of Parliament for Westmeath in the Irish House of Commons from 1798 until the Acts of Union 1800. He subsequently represented Westmeath in the House of Commons of the United Kingdom between 1801 and his death in 1824 as a Tory. He was Lord Lieutenant of Westmeath from 1815 to 1824.

Rochfort married Frances Bloomfield in July 1779, with whom he had seven sons and five daughters.

References

Year of birth uncertain
1824 deaths
18th-century Anglo-Irish people
19th-century Anglo-Irish people
High Sheriffs of County Westmeath
Irish MPs 1798–1800
Lord-Lieutenants of Westmeath
Members of the Parliament of Ireland (pre-1801) for County Westmeath constituencies
Members of the Parliament of the United Kingdom for County Westmeath constituencies (1801–1922)
Tory members of the Parliament of the United Kingdom
UK MPs 1801–1802
UK MPs 1802–1806
UK MPs 1806–1807
UK MPs 1807–1812
UK MPs 1812–1818
UK MPs 1818–1820
UK MPs 1820–1826